John P. Varkey ( – 29 August 2022) was an Indian guitarist, songwriter and composer. He began his career as a session guitarist. He brought out three albums with Jigsaw Puzzle by the label BMG Crescendo which were innovative and well accepted by the new generation and led to the formation of band Avial. John discontinued from Avial and independently directed music for many Indian big time feature films with prominent productions and directors.  His ideas and innovative sound textures made many films come to life. Varkey first came to prominence as a member of the Malayalam rock band Avial, which itself evolved out of a band called Jigsaw Puzzle. Varkey was the guitarist and songwriter for the Thrissur-based band, Slowpedalers.

Varkey studied music at the Trinity College of Music in London. He started his career as a composer in the film industry through the film Frozen.

Professional education
 8th grade in classical guitar from Trinity College London, London

Filmography

2007- Frozen  (Hindi/Ladaki, background score)
2008- Idi Sangathi  (Telugu, three songs)
2011- Karthik  (Kannada, five songs)
2012- Unnam (Malayalam, four songs and background score)
2012- I.D. (Background score)
2013- Olipporu (Eight songs)
2016-  Kammatipaadam
2017-  Penkody (Background score)
2018-  Eeda  (Travel Song Mizhi Niranju & played guitar for background score)

Awards and honours
 Jury of the 8TH MADRID IMAGINE INDIA FILM FESTIVAL selected Frozen (2007 film) which he did in 2007, for the best music.

Prominent works
1991-1997 toured with various LIVE rock bands and participated in prominent festival including Indian Institute of Technology Delhi " rendezvous "
1997-2000 founded Malayalam rock band JIGSAWPUZZLE (the first Mallu band to come in to view in MTV)
composed, arranged and produced vibrant songs like NADA NADA, THEEKANAL, FLOW etc. became internationally hits.
2000-MAY music composed and performed with Daksha Sheth, Isha Sharvani in Asia and in Helsinki music and dance festival held in Finland
2000-2001 music composed for Malayalam feature film Neythukaran directed by Priyanandanan
2002-2003 composed and arranged music for Malayalam rock band Avial
2004-2005 music composed and arranged for film Punhm directed by Gangamukhi Film and Television Institute of India and K Rajesh.
2004-2005 composed and arranged music for  film Vadhakramam directed by Kamal K. M.
2005 sound design and co produced music for fusion band Karnatrix
2006 music composed for  film Kshitij directed by Binthesh Paruri FTII
2006 music composed for experimental film KA directed by Amit Dutta
2007 composed music for  film Theerangal directed by Sanju Surendran
2007 music composed and arranged for feature film Frozen (bagged best music award from 8th MADRID IMAGINE INDIA FILM FESTIVAL) directed by Shivaji Chandrabushan
2008 music composed and arranged for docufiction Cradle of Christianity directed by Jain Joseph FTII
2008 composed music for Telugu feature film Idi Sangathi (TABU AND ABBAS in lead role) directed by Chandru Siddharth. Three songs became superhits
2008 composed and arranged music for  film When the man dies directed by Arun Sukumar FTII
2009 sound designed and music for International Film Festival of Kerala 2000 Signature Film
2010 music composed  and supervised music production of  Kannada feature film Karthik
2011 music composed and arranged for docu fiction JEWS IN KERALA directed by Sajive Pillai
2012 music composed and supervised music production  for Sibimalayil film Unnam (ASIF ALI, RIMA KALLINGAL, NEDUMUDI, LAL)
2012 music  for Hindi movie ID directed by K.M. Kamal got several international awards
2013 music and its  production supervision for Olipporu lead role Fahadh Faasil, Kalabhavan Mani
2013 supervised pre session   Background score music production  for movie Masala Republic
2014 video, audio album with Fr Bobby Jose Kattikkad  and Prof. V.G Thampi 
2014 October 22 A musical concert for the Homage to the children of Gaza  in Thrissur Regional outdoor theater 
2015 performed in Kappa TV Music Mojo, Pappaya Cafe Cochin.
2015 Live performance with LEAVES OF GRASS (a music movement  which featured  poets, and contemporary musicians) Conducted musical concerts with some eminent  poets.
2015 Composed music for Rajeev Ravi's film Kammatipaadam.
2017 Live performance with Slow peddlers at Pepper House (Alt and Pepper) 
2017 Live performance with Voters at Quilon Ashram conducted by 8 point Art cafe and DTPC  as part of Onam celebrations

References

External links

 
 

Year of birth missing
1970s births
2022 deaths
Indian rock guitarists
Musicians from Thrissur
20th-century Indian musicians
20th-century Indian male musicians
20th-century guitarists
21st-century Indian musicians
21st-century Indian male musicians
21st-century guitarists